New Law Journal (NLJ) is a weekly legal magazine for legal professionals, first published in 1822. It provides information on case law, legislation and changes in practice. It is funded by subscription and generally available to most of the legal profession.

History
It was established in 1822 as Law Journal. It was amalgamated with Law Times to become New Law Journal in 1965. From 1947 to 1965 Butterworths published two weekly journals – the Law Journal and the Law Times. These were different in style and readership, but there was a strong case for rationalisation. Largely at the urging of Richard Millett when he was chairman, the two were amalgamated at the New Law Journal. Tom Harper, till the then the editors of the Law Society Gazette, agreed to become the first editor of the new journal. Jan Miller became editor of the journal at the end of 2007.

Features
Each issue of NLJ normally contains about 25 pages of editorial, as well as advertising and regular directories of legal service providers. Contributors and key legal figures provide expert commentary and opinion in comment, speakers’ corner and law in the headlines sections.

Published weekly (48 issues per year), there are also additional bound-in directories and supplements over the year. NLJ also offers lawyers a way to earn their continuing professional development points.

See also
 Herbert Bentwich (1856–1932), owner/editor of the Law Journal for many years
 Butterworths Journal of International Banking and Financial Law
 Corporate Rescue and Insolvency
 Counsel
 Justice of the Peace
 Justice of the Peace Reports
 Tolley's Employment Law Newsletter

References

External links
 Official website

1822 establishments in the United Kingdom
Magazines published in the United Kingdom
Weekly magazines published in the United Kingdom
Legal magazines
LexisNexis academic journals
Magazines published in London
Magazines established in 1822
Professional and trade magazines